Bracknagh or Bracnagh is a small village in County Offaly, Ireland. It is at the junction of the R442 and R419 regional roads, halfway between Portarlington and Rathangan (8 km from both).

It is thought that the settlement began with a small cluster of homes built around the road junction. Expansion along connected roads included the addition of two housing developments called, "The Ring" and "The Green" by Offaly County Council and Bord na Mona.

Due to the nearest postal sorting office being in Kildare, Bracknagh is listed as a Kildare address, though it is in County Offaly.

Bracknagh is home to the Ballynowlart church, where the history reports that the congregation were burned alive in the 1600s. Bracknagh is home to St Broughan's Well, the water from which is reputed to be a cure for headaches.

Bracknagh has a national school which in the early 2000s received a facelift which combined a new build and the older section of the school. 
Bracknagh GAA is the local Gaelic Athletic Association (GAA) club and was founded in 1973. The club were the first team to win the Offaly GAA intermediate title in 1978. Since its establishment and inaugural championship win, Bracknagh GAA have added further Offaly Intermediate titles, a Junior C Championship and Senior B Championship along with several league titles. In 2019, Bracknagh GAA were named the Offaly club of the year. Bracknagh now play at Senior B level.

Bracknagh is a small village with a number of small housing estates and a local shop, post office and public house. Bracknagh's catchment area stretches from the Kildare border to the Laois border. During 2021, the Bracknagh community hall was upgraded and is used for a number of community activities.

People 
 John Joly

See also
 List of towns and villages in Ireland

References 

Towns and villages in County Offaly